The Dene Hospital is a private hospital in Gatehouse Lane, Goddards Green, West Sussex, England. It is managed by the Priory Group.

History
The original facility on the site, which was designed by George Thomas Hine, opened as the Cuckfield Isolation Hospital in May 1902. It joined the National Health Service as the Mid-Sussex Isolation Hospital in 1948 and became Goddards Green Hospital in 1960. After the Goddards Green Hospital closed in the 1990s, the site was acquired by the Priory Group, which established a mental health unit there, initially known as The Dene, and, from 2018, branded as the "Priory Hospital Burgess Hill".

References

Private hospitals in the United Kingdom
Hospitals in West Sussex
Hospitals established in 1902
1902 establishments in England